Herman Horn Johannessen (born 4 April 1964) is a Norwegian sailor and Olympic medalist. He received a bronze medal in the Soling Class at the 2000 Summer Olympics in Sydney, together with Paul Davis and Espen Stokkeland. He also competed at the 1992 Summer Olympics, in the 470 class.

Outside of sports, Herman Horn Johannessen is the co-owner and manager of the company Lisa, which produces jam and squash.

References

1964 births
Living people
Norwegian male sailors (sport)
Olympic sailors of Norway
Olympic bronze medalists for Norway
Norwegian businesspeople
People from Asker
Olympic medalists in sailing
Sailors at the 1988 Summer Olympics – 470
Sailors at the 1992 Summer Olympics – 470
Sailors at the 1996 Summer Olympics – Soling
Sailors at the 2000 Summer Olympics – Soling
Medalists at the 2000 Summer Olympics